A number of units of measurement were used in Peru to measure length, mass, area, etc. The Metric system adopted in 1862 and has been compulsory since 1869 in Peru.

System before metric system

Units from Spanish Castillian were used.

Length

One vara was equal to 0.83598 m.  One pie was equal to 0.27866 m/3 varas.

Mass

Several units were used to measure mass.  One libra was equal to 0.46009 kg.  Some other units are given below:

1 arroba = 25 libra

1 quintal = 100 libra

1 fanega = 140 libra.

Area

One topo was equal to 2706 m2.  One fanegada was equal to 6459.6 m2.

See also
 Metrication in Peru

References

Peruvian culture
Peru